Spirit of Fight is a Burmese action sports television series. It aired on Canal+ Zat Lenn. It focuses on the fighting sport of Lethwei. Its season 1 aired from April 28 to June 2, 2019, on every Sunday at 19:00 for 6 episodes and season 2 aired from March 5 to April 9, 2020, on every Thursday at 20:00 for 6 episodes.

Cast
Ye Naung as Htun Htet
Khar Ra as Phoenix
Htun Naing Oo as Ye Hein
Yin Let as Hsu Lin
May Myat Noe as Nora
Thel Nandar Soe as May Nine
San Htut as Agga
Yu Nandar as Naw Phaw Say
Aung Khine as U Maung
May Kabyar as Suzan
Zin Wine
Nay Aung

References

Burmese television series